Morialta is a single-member electoral district for the South Australian House of Assembly. It is a 356 km2 electorate stretching from the Adelaide Hills to the outer eastern and north-eastern suburbs of Adelaide, taking in the suburbs and localities of Auldana, Ashton, Athelstone, Basket Range, Birdwood, Castambul, Cherryville, Cudlee Creek, Forest Range, Gumeracha, Highbury, Kenton Valley, Lenswood, Lobethal, Marble Hill, Montacute, Mount Torrens, Norton Summit, Rostrevor, Summertown, Teringie, Uraidla and Woodforde, as well as part of Chain of Ponds.

Morialta is a word derived from the Kaurna language, originally thought to be marri-yartalla, "marri" meaning east and yertala meaning "flowing water". More recent research has shown that the etymology of the word is marri, meaning "east" and probably yarta, meaning "land, earth, country", or possibly yalta, meaning "cool, fresh, airy"; therefore, probably meaning "eastern land or country". The land used by the Morialta Conservation Park was traditionally occupied by the Kaurna people.

Morialta was the new name adopted in 2002 for the electoral district of Coles, which was first created at the 1970 election and represented over the years by several distinguished MPs, including former Dunstan Labor government Attorney General Len King, and former Premier Des Corcoran. Morialta was won at the 2002 election by Liberal minister Joan Hall, the last member for Coles, on a margin of 4.1 percent, suffering a -2.4 percent swing. At the 2006 election, Hall was thought likely to again hold the seat with a reduced margin, but was defeated by Labor candidate Lindsay Simmons amidst Labor's statewide landslide, receiving a 12 percent two-party preferred swing to finish with a 7.9 percent margin. However, at the 2010 election the electorate there was a swing of 11.1 percent back to the Liberals, with candidate John Gardner defeating Simmons by a margin of 4.1 percent.

Members for Morialta

Election results

Notes

References
 ECSA profile for Morialta: 2018
 ABC profile for Morialta: 2018
 Poll Bludger profile for Morialta: 2018

2002 establishments in Australia
Electoral districts of South Australia